The 2008 Japanese Formula 3 Championship was the 30th edition of the Japanese Formula 3 Championship. Dutchman Carlo van Dam took the main title, with Hideki Yamauchi taking the National Class. TOM'S took their eighth constructors title in a row.

Teams and drivers

Notes

Race calendar and results

Standings

Championship Class
Points are awarded as follows:

Teams
Points are awarded as follows:

Engine Tuners
Points are awarded as follows:

National Class
Points are awarded as follows:

References

External links
 Official Site 

Formula Three
Japanese Formula 3 Championship seasons
Japan
Japanese Formula 3